"Why Not Me" is a song written by Harlan Howard, Sonny Throckmorton and Brent Maher, and recorded by American country music duo The Judds. It was released in September 1984 as the first single and title track from the album of the same name.  The song was their second number one on the country chart. The single was number one for two weeks and spent a total of fifteen weeks on the country chart.

Cover versions
In 2007, Jill Johnson covered the song on the Music Row album.
 In 2015, Emily Ann Roberts, covered "Why Not Me" on The Voice U.S. season 9, charting to Number 10 in the iTunes charts

Chart performance

Certifications

References

1984 singles
The Judds songs
Songs written by Harlan Howard
Songs written by Sonny Throckmorton
RCA Records singles
Curb Records singles
Jill Johnson songs
Songs written by Brent Maher
Song recordings produced by Brent Maher
1984 songs